Konstantinos Stivachtis (born 22 May 1980) is a Greek male volleyball player. He is part of the Greece men's national volleyball team. On club level he plays for Kifissia.

Sporting achievements

Club

International competitions
 2017/2018   CEV Challenge Cup, with Olympiacos Piraeus (runner-up)

National championships
 2017/2018  Greek Championship, with Olympiacos Piraeus
 2018/2019  Greek Championship, with Olympiacos Piraeus
 2020/2021  Greek Championship, with Olympiacos Piraeus

National Cups
 2015/2016  Greek Cup , with Olympiacos Piraeus
 2016/2017  Greek Cup , with Olympiacos Piraeus

National League Cups
 2015/2016  Greek League Cup, with Olympiacos Piraeus
 2016/2017  Greek League Cup, with Olympiacos Piraeus
 2017/2018  Greek League Cup, with Olympiacos Piraeus
 2018/2019  Greek League Cup, with Olympiacos Piraeus

Individually
 2020/21 Greek Championship Most Valuable Player

References

External links
 profile at FIVB.org
 profile, club career, info at greekvolley.gr 
 

1980 births
Living people
Greek men's volleyball players
Olympiacos S.C. players
A.C. Orestias players
Volleyball players from Athens
Competitors at the 2018 Mediterranean Games
Mediterranean Games bronze medalists for Greece
Mediterranean Games medalists in volleyball